Causapscal is a city in the Canadian province of Quebec, located in La Matapédia Regional County Municipality. It is located at the confluence of the Matapédia and Causapscal Rivers, along Quebec Route 132, approximately halfway between Mont-Joli and Campbellton, New Brunswick. It is served by the Causapscal railway station (the town can be reached by Via Rail on the named train The Ocean, between Montreal and Halifax) and the Causapscal Airport.

Etymology
The city's name is taken from the geographic township of Casupscull (proclaimed in 1864), which in turn is derived from the Mi'kmaq word Goesôpsiag (or Gesapsgel, Gesôpsgigel), meaning "stony bottom", "swift water", or "rocky point", likely referring to the rocky river bed of the Causapscal River.

History
Development of the place followed the construction of the Intercolonial Railway in the 1860s. In 1870, the Parish of Saint-Jacques-le-Majeur was established, and the following year, the post office opened.

In 1897, the Parish Municipality of Saint-Jacques-le-Majeur-de-Causapscal was incorporated, named after the parish and the geographic township. In 1928, the village itself separated from the parish municipality and was incorporated as the Village Municipality of Causapscal. In 1957, the parish municipality lost more territory when the Municipality of Sainte-Marguerite was formed. In 1965, Causapscal gained ville (city/town) status.

On December 31, 1997, the Parish Municipality of Saint-Jacques-le-Majeur-de-Causapscal was amalgamated into the City of Causapscal.

Geography
Causapscal is located in the Matapédia Valley at the confluence of the Matapédia and Causapscal Rivers.

Demographics 

Canada Census data before 2001 (pre-merger):

 Combined population in 1996: 2,811 (-2.0% from 1991)
 Causapscal (ville): 2,080 (-3.7% from 1991)
 Saint-Jacques-le-Majeur-de-Causapscal (parish): 731 (+3.4% from 1991)

 Combined population in 1991: 2,867
 Causapscal (ville): 2160
 Saint-Jacques-le-Majeur-de-Causapscal (parish): 707

Municipal council
 Mayor: Mario Côté
 Councillors: Renaud Valois, Françoise Jean, Maurice Durette, Élaine Bellavance, Denis Viel, David Desjardins

Notable former residents
 Maurice "Mom" Boucher (born June 21, 1953) Canadian outlaw biker, former President of the Hells Angels' Montreal chapter.

See also
 List of cities in Quebec

References

External links

  Ville de Causapscal

Cities and towns in Quebec
Incorporated places in Bas-Saint-Laurent
La Matapédia Regional County Municipality